30th Army may refer to:

30th Army (People's Republic of China)
30th Army (Soviet Union)
Thirtieth Army (Japan), a unit of the Imperial Japanese Army